XHECQ-FM is a radio station on 104.1 FM in Culiacán, Sinaloa. It is owned by Promomedios and carries the La Mejor grupera format from MVS Radio.

History

XECQ-AM 920 received its concession on April 26, 1947. It was owned by Radio Culiacán and operated with 1,000 watts during the day and 100 watts at night. In the 1980s, daytime power was raised to 5,000 watts, and the 1990s saw nighttime power increase to 500.

XECQ migrated to FM in 2010 as XHECQ-FM 104.1.

On June 1, 2020, XHECQ-FM became an affiliate of the La Mejor grupera network from MVS Radio.

References

Radio stations in Sinaloa